Roberto Porta (7 June 1913 – 2 January 1984) was a Uruguayan–Italian footballer who played as a forward.

During his club career he played for Nacional (Uruguay), Inter (Italy) and Independiente (Argentina). He earned 33 caps and scored 13 goals for the Uruguay national football team from 1937 to 1945, and also played 1 match for the Italy national football team in 1935, thereby being part of the squad that won the 1933–35 Central European International Cup.

He was the Uruguay national team's coach at the 1974 FIFA World Cup.

Honours

International 
Italy
 Central European International Cup: 1933-35

Uruguay
 South American Championship: 1942
 South American Championship: Runner-up 1939, 1941

References

External links

Profile (in Spanish)

1913 births
1984 deaths
Uruguayan footballers
Uruguay international footballers
Uruguayan football managers
Uruguayan people of Italian descent
Italian footballers
Italy international footballers
Uruguayan Primera División players
Club Nacional de Football players
Inter Milan players
Club Atlético Independiente footballers
Uruguayan expatriate footballers
Expatriate footballers in Argentina
1974 FIFA World Cup managers
Dual internationalists (football)
Uruguay national football team managers
Copa América-winning players
Association football forwards